Philetus may refer to:

Philetus (biblical figure), Christian false teacher mentioned by Paul in 2 Timothy 2:15—18.
Philetus (martyr) (d.121) Roman senator and Christian martyr
Philetus, assistant of Hermogenes the magician in The Golden Legend

People with the first name Philetus include
 Philetus Norris (1821-1885), superintendent of Yellowstone National Park
 Philetus Sawyer (1816-1900), Wisconsin Republican politician
 Philetus Swift (1763-1828), New York politician